Guacamaya(s) may refer to:

 Guacamaya, a Mayan name for a macaw or the thick-billed parrot (Rhynchopsitta pachyrhyncha)
 Guacamaya (plant), a genus of plants native to South America
 Guacamaya Formation, a geologic formation in Mexico
 Guacamayas, Boyacá, a town and municipality in the Colombian Department of Boyacá
Guacamaya (snack), a Mexican snack from León, Guanajuato
Guacamaya (hacktivist), a hacktivist group named after the Mayan name for a macaw